Ilex pedunculosa, called longstalk holly, is a species of flowering plant in the genus Ilex, native to central and southern China, Taiwan, and Japan. A lanky shrub or shrubby tree typically reaching  in the garden, it is quite cold hardy (to USDA zone 5a). It gets its specific epithet and common name from its long peduncle (the stalk from which the berry depends). The red berries are relished by birds. It is deer resistant.

References

pedunculosa
Flora of China
Flora of Taiwan
Flora of Japan
Ornamental trees
Plants described in 1868